Female Novel is a 2005 Russian telenovela series directed by Sergei Snezhkin based on the novel The Steadfast Tin Soldatov by Marina Mareeva.

Plot
An accident occurs during a hot summer day in which two expensive cars collide. In the "Volvo" is Kirill with his girlfriend Lolita. He is a successful and attractive publisher. In the "Saab" Andrei is driver with Evgenia as passenger along with her son. She works as a photographer in a studio. Kirill can charm women by using his mere gaze so that they are immediately ready to do anything, just to be with him. He wants to use this trick as bait for Evgenia, since he becomes infatuated with her. But Evgeniya does not succumb to either the seductive gaze nor for the love of the casual acquaintance. After the car accident the young mother's life changes radically.

Cast
Dina Korzun as Evgenia
Konstantin Khabensky as Kirill
Artur Vakha as Pyotr
Aleksandr Domogarov as Oleg Ermakov
Era Ziganshina as Alina Borisovna
Mikhail Wasserbaum as Ilya
Ivan Krasko as Vladislav Petrovich
Oksana Akinshina as Ksenia
Daria Lesnikova as Nadya 
Yan Tsapnik as Torchinski
Valeriy Kukhareshin as Popov
Anna Basnchikova as Natasha / Lolita
Sergei Barkovsky as Viktor
Sergei Koshonin as psychologist
Marina Rokina as Lena
Andrei Astrakhantsev as Andrei

References

External links

Russian telenovelas
Channel One Russia original programming
2005 Russian television series debuts
2005 Russian television series endings
2000s Russian television series